Sugar Grove is a village in Kane County, Illinois, United States. The population at the 2010 census was 8,997, and in 2018 the estimated population was 9,803.

Geography
Sugar Grove is located in southern Kane County at  (41.772529, -88.442374). It is bordered to the east by the city of Aurora and to the west by the village of Big Rock. Sugar Grove nearly encircles the unincorporated community of Prestbury, and the city of Yorkville is to the south.

Sugar Grove is located within a band of heavy growth on the western edge of the Chicago metropolitan area, stretching from approximately the Huntley area in McHenry County to the New Lenox area in Will County. Sugar Grove adopted its first comprehensive land use plan on January 12, 1981.

Demographics

As of the census of 2000, there were 3,909 people, 1,272 households, and 1,074 families residing in the village. The racial makeup of the village was 95.86% White, 1.38% African American, 0.03% Native American, 0.51% Asian, 1.28% from other races, and 0.95% from two or more races. Hispanic or Latino of any race were 4.43% of the population.

There were 1,272 households, out of which 47.2% had children under the age of 18 living with them, 76.7% were married couples living together, 5.1% had a female householder with no husband present, and 15.5% were non-families. 12.0% of all households were made up of individuals, and 2.9% had someone living alone who was 65 years of age or older.  The average household size was 3.07 and the average family size was 3.37.

In the village, the population was spread out, with 32.4% under the age of 18, 5.9% from 18 to 24, 33.9% from 25 to 44, 23.1% from 45 to 64, and 4.7% who were 65 years of age or older.  The median age was 35 years. For every 100 females, there were 102.5 males.  For every 100 females age 18 and over, there were 99.3 males.

The median income for a household in the village was $75,856, and the median income for a family was $83,332. Males had a median income of $52,425 versus $35,028 for females. The per capita income for the village was $30,299.  About 1.1% of families and 1.8% of the population were below the poverty line, including 1.5% of those under age 18 and 3.4% of those age 65 or over.

Transportation and utilities
Sugar Grove is accessible by one interstate highway (Interstate 88), one US highway (US Route 30), and two state highways (Illinois Route 47 and Illinois Route 56). Route 56 connects the central part of Sugar Grove to Interstate 88. US 30 utilizes the same pavement as Illinois Route 47 from the village's southern border to the interchange with Illinois Route 56. US 30 then turns west. Illinois Route 47 is a heavily travelled route at the far western edge of the Chicago area and runs north–south through the village. Aurora Municipal Airport is situated on the northwest side of town, capable of handling small jets. The BNSF Railway's mainline from Chicago to Seattle runs through the village. The Virgil Gilman Trail is a paved bicycle trail connecting the city of Aurora to the east with Waubonsee Community College to the north.

Major highways
Major highways in Sugar Grove include:

Interstate Highways
 Interstate 88

US Highways
 US 30

Illinois Highways
 Route 47
 Route 56
 Route 110

Education
Students who live in Sugar Grove attend either Kaneland Community Unit School District #302 or West Aurora School District #129.  In Kaneland, children who are in grades K-5 attend Kaneland John Shields Elementary School in Sugar Grove or Kaneland McDole Elementary School in Montgomery.  For grades 6–8, they attend Kaneland Harter Middle School in Sugar Grove, while grades 9-12 are served by Kaneland High School in Maple Park.

Waubonsee Community College, a two-year public community college, is located on Route 47 in the northern part of Sugar Grove.

Services
In 2004, the library district passed an $8 million building bond for a new library. The bond was issued in February 2005. The doors opened on August 8, 2009. The library district service area encompasses nearly all of Sugar Grove Township and the portion of Blackberry Township south of Seavey Road. Excluded from this geography are the areas in the city of Aurora and the village of North Aurora. In 2008, the district population was 15,476, of which 40% had a library card.

Notable people
 P. J. Fleck, head football coach at University of Minnesota
 Leah Hayes, swimmer, Sports Illustrated Kids 2018 SportsKid of the Year
 Julie Montagu, Viscountess Hinchingbrooke, entrepreneur, yoga instructor, blogger, writer and reality television star
 Jim Oberweis, businessman and politician
 John F. Petit, businessman and politician; born in Sugar Grove

References

External links
Official website

 
Villages in Illinois
Villages in Kane County, Illinois
Populated places established in 1957
1957 establishments in Illinois